Maigret Sets a Trap (French: Maigret tend un piège) is a 1955 detective novel by the Belgian novelist Georges Simenon featuring his fictional character Jules Maigret.

Plot
Maigret sets a trap for a serial killer, hoping to lure him into error.

Adaptations
 It was adapted as a 1958 film, entitled Maigret Sets a Trap with Jean Gabin as Maigret 
 An episode for the 1960s BBC television series Maigret with Rupert Davies as Maigret (s03e12). 
 An episode for the 1992 ITV television series Maigret with Michael Gambon as Maigret (s01e06).
 In France, Bruno Cremer, who played Maigret in 54 adaptations during 1991–2005, adapted this story in 1996 (episode 26 of 54, aka s06e02).
 An episode for ITV's 2016 television series Maigret with Rowan Atkinson as Maigret (s01e01).

References

1955 Belgian novels
Maigret novels
Belgian novels adapted into films
Presses de la Cité books